The Nasar or Nasir, Nassiri, Nasiri) tribe is an ethnic Pashtoon Ghilzai tribe mainly living in Afghanistan and some in Pakistan. Nasar has mostly remained a nomadic tribe throughout history due to which it spread in the provinces of Kunar, Paktia, Laghman, Nangarhar and Ghazni province. The Nasar people also live in the Khyber Pakhtunkhwa region (Dera Ismail Khan, Draban Kalan) and Balochistan province (Districts like Loralai, Quetta, Duki, Sanjavi, Zhob and Musakhail).
(History)
It is said that the nasars come from the tribe of khiljis and are the descendants of Allaudin khilji but there is no evidence of that.The nasars have been part of various armies just like the kakars, kasis, Tareens, barechs etc.

Ghilji Pashtun tribes
Pashto-language surnames